The Votary of Wealth is a 1799 comedy play by the British writer Joseph George Holman.

The original Covent Garden cast included William Thomas Lewis as Drooply, Alexander Pope as Leonard Vizorly, Joseph Shepherd Munden as Oakworth, John Fawcett as Sharpset, Charles Murray as Clevland, John Emery as Old Vizorly, Julia Betterton as Caroline, Nannette Johnston as Gangica and Jane Pope as Julia Cleveland.

References

Bibliography
 Nicoll, Allardyce. A History of English Drama 1660–1900: Volume III. Cambridge University Press, 2009.
 Hogan, C.B (ed.) The London Stage, 1660–1800: Volume V. Southern Illinois University Press, 1968.

1799 plays
British plays
Comedy plays
West End plays
Plays set in London